Sergeyevka is a rural locality (a selo) and the administrative center of Sergeyevsky Selsoviet of Blagoveshchensky District, Amur Oblast, Russia. The population was 420 as of 2018. There are 8 streets.

Geography 
Sergeyevka is located on the left bank of the Amur River, 68 km north of Blagoveshchensk (the district's administrative centre) by road. Bibikovo is the nearest rural locality.

References 

Rural localities in Blagoveshchensky District, Amur Oblast